Astrotrichilia elegans is a species of plants in the family Meliaceae. It is found in Madagascar.

References

External links
 Astrotrichilia elegans at The Plant List
 Astrotrichilia elegans at Tropicos

Meliaceae
Plants described in 1996
Endemic flora of Madagascar